Christmas to Christmas is the first Christmas album released on October 17, 1995 by American country music artist Toby Keith. His first studio album of Christmas music, it produced one single which charted from Christmas airplay in late 1995-early 1996: the track "Santa I'm Right Here", which peaked at #50 on the Hot Country Songs charts.

Critical reception
Roch Parisien of AllMusic reviewed the album favorably, stating that "The playing is casual, back-porch rootsy. It is first and foremost a collection of good songs, well performed, that just happen to be about Christmas."

Track listing
"Santa, I'm Right Here" (Ron Reynolds) - 4:39
"Bethlehem in Birmingham" (Weston Harvey, Scott Lynch) - 3:18
"Christmas Rock" (Lewis Anderson) - 2:33
"Blame It on the Mistletoe" (Toby Keith) - 3:06
"Santa's Gonna Take It All Back" (Keith, Reynolds) - 3:18
"The Night Before Christmas" (Sam Hogin, Nelson Larkin, Jim McBride) - 3:42
"Hot Rod Sleigh" (Keith) - 3:38
"Christmas to Christmas" (Ron Hallard, Alan Rhody) - 3:23
"Jesus Gets Jealous of Santa Claus" (Vernon Rust, Keith Urban) - 3:35
"Mary, It's Christmas" (Keith, Reynolds) - 3:19
"All I Want for Christmas" (Ronnie Rogers) - 3:35
"What Made the Baby Cry?" (William Golay) - 4:00

Personnel
 Michael Black - background vocals
 Duncan Cameron - electric guitar
 Tom Flora - background vocals
 Sonny Garrish - steel guitar
 Felipe Chele Gonzalez - harmonica
 Owen Hale - drums
 Clayton Ivey - keyboards
 Toby Keith - lead vocals
 B. James Lowry - acoustic guitar
 Gary Lunn - bass guitar
 Ron "Snake" Reynolds - electric guitar, percussion
 Russell Terrell - background vocals
 Dennis Wilson - background vocals
 Reggie Young - electric guitar

References

1995 Christmas albums
Toby Keith albums
Mercury Records albums
Albums produced by Harold Shedd
Christmas albums by American artists
Country Christmas albums